Claudio Nicolás Castro Salas (born 26 May 1983) is a Chilean politician who currently serves as mayor of Renca.

References

External links
 

1983 births
Living people

21st-century Chilean lawyers
21st-century Chilean politicians
Pontifical Catholic University of Chile alumni
Alumni of the London School of Economics
Christian Democratic Party (Chile) politicians
Mayors of places in Chile